The Twenty-ninth Dynasty of Egypt (notated Dynasty XXIX, alternatively 29th Dynasty or Dynasty 29) is usually classified as the fourth Dynasty of the Ancient Egyptian Late Period. It was founded after the overthrow of Amyrtaeus, the only Pharaoh of the 28th Dynasty, by Nefaarud I in 398 BC, and disestablished upon the overthrow of Nefaarud II in 380 BC.

History 

Nefaarud I founded the 29th Dynasty (according to an account preserved in a papyrus in the Brooklyn Museum) by defeating Amyrtaeus in open battle, and later putting him to death at Memphis. Nefaarud then made Mendes his capital.

On Nefaarud's death, two rival factions fought for the throne: one behind his son Muthis, and the other supporting a usurper Psammuthes; although Psammuthes was successful, he only managed to reign for a year.

Psammuthes was overthrown by Hakor, who claimed to be the grandson of Nefaarud I. He successfully resisted Persian attempts to reconquer Egypt, drawing support from Athens (until the Peace of Antalcidas in 387 BC), and from the rebel king of Cyprus, Evagoras. Although his son Nefaarud II became king on his death, the younger Nefaarud was unable to keep hold of his inheritance.

Pharaohs of the 29th Dynasty

Timeline of the 29th Dynasty

References 
.
.
. Translated by David Lorton.
.
.

 
States and territories established in the 4th century BC
States and territories disestablished in the 4th century BC
29
398 BC
390s BC establishments
4th-century BC establishments in Egypt
380 BC
4th-century BC disestablishments in Egypt